Lorenz Grabovac (born 25 July 1997) is an Austrian football player. He plays for First Vienna FC.

Club career
He made his Austrian Football First League debut for FC Liefering on 21 August 2015 in a game against SC Wiener Neustadt.

References

External links
 

1997 births
People from Zwettl
Living people
Austrian footballers
Austria youth international footballers
Austrian people of Croatian descent
FC Liefering players
2. Liga (Austria) players
SKN St. Pölten players
First Vienna FC players
Austrian Football Bundesliga players
Association football forwards
Footballers from Lower Austria